Qaleh-ye Azraj (also Romanized as Qal‘eh-ye Azraj; also known as Qal‘eh, Qal‘eh Avzaj, Qal‘eh-ye Arzaj, and Qal‘eh-ye Tārvandī) is a village in Enaj Rural District, Qareh Chay District, Khondab County, Markazi Province, Iran. At the 2006 census, its population was 552, in 147 families.

References 

Populated places in Khondab County